U.S. Route 285 (US 285) is a north–south U.S. highway that runs from Sanderson, TX to Denver, CO. In the state of New Mexico, US 285 enters the state from Texas south of Loving. The highway runs through the major cities of Carlsbad, Roswell, and Santa Fe. The highway exits the state into Colorado approximately 25 miles north of Tres Piedras.

Route description

US 285 enters New Mexico from Texas approximately 23 miles south of Loving. As US 285 traverses north on the eastern plains of New Mexico, it passes through the towns of Carlsbad, Artesia and then Roswell. In Artesia, the route intersects with US 82. In Carlsbad, US 285 has an overlap with US 62 and US 180 through the town. In Roswell, the route intersects with US 70 and US 380, having a short overlap with US 70. 

The route next heads northwest to Vaughn where it has a brief concurrency with US 54 and US 60. The route then continues northwest and has a junction with Interstate 40 (I-40) at Clines Corners.

Heading north out of Clines Corners, the route continues towards the state capital. At the outskirts of Santa Fe, the route becomes concurrent with I-25, US 84, and its unsigned parent (US 85) for several miles heading west through the foothills of the Sangre De Cristo Mountains to Santa Fe. After exiting I-25, US 285 follows Saint Francis Drive through Santa Fe. The route continues north by northwest to Española and Chamita, where the concurrency with US 84 ends. The route then traverses the Carson National Forest where US 285 now makes a long climb up to the Colorado Plateau, passing through Ojo Caliente as it ascends to the San Luis Valley. After crossing US 64, the highway passes through the village of Tres Piedras, New Mexico at the south end of the valley, then proceeds north to the Colorado border near the Rio Grande del Norte National Monument.

Major intersections

Roswell truck route

Gallery

References

Transportation in Eddy County, New Mexico
Transportation in Chaves County, New Mexico
Transportation in De Baca County, New Mexico
Transportation in Lincoln County, New Mexico
Transportation in Guadalupe County, New Mexico
Transportation in Torrance County, New Mexico
Transportation in San Miguel County, New Mexico
Transportation in Santa Fe County, New Mexico
Transportation in Rio Arriba County, New Mexico
Transportation in Taos County, New Mexico
 New Mexico
85-2